Tomopleura oscitans is a species of sea snail, a marine gastropod mollusk in the family Borsoniidae.

Description
The size of the shell varies between 15 mm and 23 mm. It has 9 whorls in the teleoconch..

Distribution
This marine species occurs off Durban Bay, South Africa, to Mozambique.

References

 Kilburn R.N. (1986). Turridae (Mollusca: Gastropoda) of southern Africa and Mozambique. Part 3. Subfamily Borsoniinae. Annals of the Natal Museum. 27: 633–720.
 Steyn, D.G. & Lussi, M. (1998) Marine Shells of South Africa. An Illustrated Collector’s Guide to Beached Shells. Ekogilde Publishers, Hartebeespoort, South Africa, ii + 264 pp. page(s): 156

External links
 

oscitans
Gastropods described in 1986